The United Nations Educational, Scientific and Cultural Organization (UNESCO) World Heritage Sites are places of importance to cultural or natural heritage as described in the UNESCO World Heritage Convention, established in 1972. Cultural heritage consists of monuments (such as architectural works, monumental sculptures, or inscriptions), groups of buildings, and sites (including archaeological sites). Natural features (consisting of physical and biological formations), geological and physiographical formations (including habitats of threatened species of animals and plants), and natural sites which are important from the point of view of science, conservation or natural beauty, are defined as natural heritage.

The Republic of Indonesia ratified the convention on 6 June 1989, making its historical sites eligible for inclusion on the list. , there are nine World Heritage Sites in Indonesia, five of which are cultural and four are natural. This makes Indonesia possess the highest number of sites in Southeast Asia. The first four sites to be inscribed to the list were the Borobudur Temple Compounds, the Prambanan Temple Compounds, Ujung Kulon National Park, and Komodo National Park in 1991. The most recent addition to the list was the Ombilin Coal Mining Heritage of Sawahlunto in 2019. In 2011, the Tropical Rainforest Heritage of Sumatra was inscribed to the list of World Heritage in Danger, due to threats posed by poaching, illegal logging, agricultural encroachment, and plans to build roads through the site. In addition, Indonesia has 19 sites on the tentative list.



World Heritage Sites 
UNESCO lists sites under ten criteria; each entry must meet at least one of the criteria. Criteria i through vi are cultural, and vii through x are natural.

Tentative list
The following 19 sites are on the Tentative List for Indonesia, meaning that the government intends to consider them for nomination in the future:

See also

 List of World Heritage Sites in Southeast Asia
 Culture of Indonesia
 Architecture of Indonesia

References

 01
Indonesia
World Heritage Sites
Landmarks in Indonesia
World Heritage Sites